Studies in Logic, Grammar and Rhetoric is a journal of philosophy, publishing articles of diverse streams in English.

See also 
 List of philosophy journals

References

External links 
 
 sciendo.com: Studies in Logic, Grammar and Rhetoric, The Journal of University of Bialystok 

Rhetoric journals
Quarterly journals
Logic journals